Listed below are the dates and results for the 2008 FIFA Futsal World Cup qualification rounds for UEFA teams. A total of 38 teams took part, divided in 10 Groups - eight groups of 4 teams each and two groups of 3 teams each - competing for 6 places in the World Cup.

Qualifying first round
From 23 February to 2 March 2008

Group 1
Was held in Pionir Hall - Belgrade, Serbia

*France didn't attend the tournament

Group 2 
Was held in JU KSC "Mladost" - Visoko, Bosnia-Herzegovina

Group 3 
Was held in Pabellón Multiusos Ciudad de Cáceres - Cáceres, Spain

Group 4 
Was held in Gyöngyösi Városi Sport es Rendezvény Csarnok - Gyöngyös, Hungary

Group 5 
Was held in Romeo Iamandi - Buzau, Romania

Group 6 
Was held in Zimní Stadión - Chrudim, Czech Republic

Group 7 
Was held in Hibernians Pavillon - Corradino - Paola, Malta

Group 8 
Was held in Giovanni Paolo II - Pescara, Italy

Group 9 
Was held in Ugur Inan Spor Salonu - Aydin, Turkey

Slovensko Slovensko 	4 : 2 	Turecko Turecko 	
				
28. február 	Portugalsko Portugalsko 	4 : 0 	Lotyšsko Lotyšsko 	
				
29. február 	Lotyšsko Lotyšsko 	2 : 3 	Turecko Turecko 	
				
29. február 	Slovensko Slovensko 	0 : 3 	Portugalsko Portugalsko 	
				
2. marec 	Lotyšsko Lotyšsko 	0 : 4 	Slovensko Slovensko 	
				
2. marec 	Portugalsko Portugalsko 	3 : 2 	Turecko Turecko

Group 10 
Was held in Palace of Culture and Sports - Varna, Bulgaria

Play-offs

1st Leg 
From 29 March to 2 April 2008

2nd Leg 
From 12  to 16 April 2008

Czech Republic won 3–3 on aggregate (Away Goals).

Russia won 6–2 on aggregate.

Italy won 9–3 on aggregate.

Spain won 13–1 on aggregate.

Portugal won 9–1 on aggregate.

Ukraine won 6–5 on aggregate.

Qualified teams

References

Qualification (Uefa), 2008 Fifa Futsal World Cup
Qualification
FIFA Futsal World Cup qualification (UEFA)